Francesco Pisano (born 29 April 1986) is an Italian professional footballer who plays as a right back.

Club career
On 20 August 2015, Pisano signed for Bolton Wanderers on a two-year contract. Pisano made his debut for the club on 26 September in a 2-2 draw with Brighton & Hove Albion. This would be his first of only three games for the club.

On 1 February 2016, Pisano joined Avellino on loan until the end of the season.

On 25 August 2016 Pisano was signed by Lega Pro newcomer Olbia.

Career statistics

Notes

References

External links
Profile on club website 
Profile on Lega Calcio website
Profile on Soccerbase website

1986 births
Living people
Sportspeople from Cagliari
Footballers from Sardinia
Italian footballers
Association football defenders
Serie A players
Serie B players
Serie C players
Cagliari Calcio players
U.S. Avellino 1912 players
Olbia Calcio 1905 players
English Football League players
Bolton Wanderers F.C. players
Italian expatriate footballers
Italian expatriate sportspeople in England
Expatriate footballers in England
Italy youth international footballers
Italy under-21 international footballers